ASAP Mob (stylized as A$AP Mob, ASAP being an acronym for "Always Strive And Prosper") is an American hip hop collective formed in 2006 in Harlem, New York City, that consists of rappers (most of whom carry the "ASAP" moniker), record producers, music video directors and fashion designers.

In August 2012, the collective released the mixtape Lords Never Worry. They released the single "Trillmatic" in December 2013, followed by their debut studio album, Cozy Tapes Vol. 1: Friends, in October 2016.

History

Formation and early beginnings (2006–2012) 
In 2006, Steven Rodriguez, professionally known as A$AP Yams, formed the collective with fellow New Yorkers A$AP Bari and A$AP Illz. Harlem rapper A$AP Rocky joined later. In the summer of 2011, the group released  music videos for Rocky's singles "Peso" and "Purple Swag," produced by A$AP Ty Beats. Rocky followed up with his mixtape Live.Love.A$AP in October, signing a record deal with Sony Music Entertainment that month.

Lords Never Worry (2012–2014) 

On August 27, 2012, A$AP Mob released their debut project, a mixtape titled Lords Never Worry, as a free download. From September to November, Rocky toured with opening acts Schoolboy Q, Danny Brown, and A$AP Mob in support of his solo debut album.

In January 2013, A$AP Ferg signed a joint venture deal with RCA and Polo Grounds, which released his single "Work" for retail on iTunes. An official remix of "Work", featuring Rocky, French Montana, Schoolboy Q and Trinidad James, followed.

Rocky's debut album Long. Live. A$AP, was released on January 15, 2013, debuting at number one on the Billboard 200 chart, with first-week sales of 139,000 copies in the United States.

A$AP Ferg announced that A$AP Mob would release their debut album after the release of his solo debut album Trap Lord, on August 20, 2013. The album peaked at number nine on the Billboard 200 and number four on the Top R&B/Hip-Hop Albums chart, with first-week sales of 32,000 copies in the United States. In November 2013, A$AP Rocky announced that A$AP Mob's debut album would be titled Lords. On December 4, 2013, the album's first single, entitled "Trillmatic." The album title was then changed to L.O.R.D. On January 13, 2014, the single "See Me" by A$AP Ant was released.

On September 26, 2014, A$AP Yams revealed that L.O.R.D. had been shelved.

Cozy Tapes series (2015–present) 
On January 18, 2015, A$AP Mob revealed that A$AP Yams had died of acute mixed drug intoxication. On October 15, 2016, A$AP Rocky confirmed that the group's compilation album Cozy Tapes Vol. 1: Friends was completed. Dedicated to A$AP Yams, the album was released on October 31, 2016, and featured several artists, including Playboi Carti, Skepta and Tyler, The Creator.

On August 1, 2017, A$AP Rocky announced that Cozy Tapes Vol. 2: Too Cozy would be released on August 25, preceded by ASAP Twelvyy's 12 album on August 4 and ASAP Ferg's Still Striving album on August 18.

On January 13, 2019, ASAP Ant announced that he was leaving the collective to focus on his solo career. He returned in April, confirming that the collective had begun work on their third studio album, Cozy Tapes 3.

Deaths of ASAP Members
On January 18, 2015, ASAP Yams was found dead at the age of 26. The cause of death was ruled an overdose due to mixed drug intoxication, although ASAP Mob members and affiliates claimed that Yams had died of asphyxiating on vomit brought on by sleep apnea.

On February 2, 2020, J. SCOTT, also known as A$AP Snacks, died.

On April 8, 2020, Chynna was found dead of an accidental drug overdose. She was 25 years old.

On October 16, 2021, A$AP Josh died.

Discography

Studio albums

Mixtapes

Singles

Other charted songs

Music videos

Awards and nominations

BET Awards 

!
|-
|2014
|rowspan="2"|ASAP Mob
|rowspan="2"|Best Group
|rowspan="2" 
|
|-
|2015
|
|-

References 

African-American musical groups
Hip hop collectives
Hip hop groups from New York City
Musical groups established in 2007
RCA Records artists
2007 establishments in New York City
 
Trap musicians